Graham Agassiz (born 8 January 1990) is a Canadian freeride mountain biker from Kamloops, British Columbia.

Agassiz travels internationally, and has participated in mountain bike films and competitions. He is a bronze medalist from 2015 Red Bull Rampage event. He was also the top qualifier at the Red Bull Rampage in 2014. He also began hosting a mountain bike competition at the Kamloops Bike Ranch in 2014. In 2010 he had the best year in Freeride Mountain Bike World Tours placing 12th overall in rankings. He also had a special documentary film featured by X-Games called from "Ashes to Agassiz" the film debuted on 25 August, of 2015.

Agassiz' sponsors include Monster Energy, Kona Bicycle Company, RockShox, and Dakine.

References

Living people
Canadian male cyclists
Cyclists from British Columbia
Sportspeople from Kamloops
Freeride mountain bikers
Canadian mountain bikers
1990 births
21st-century Canadian people